The 2014–15 season will be Bharat FC's first season in the I-League and first season in existence.

Background
On 25 August 2014 it was announced that Kalyani Group had won the bidding rights to a new I-League team and that they would base the team in Pune, Maharashtra. On 4 November 2014 it was announced that former Wolverhampton Wanderers defender Stuart Watkiss would be the first head coach of the team's history. Then, six days later, on 10 November, it was announced that the team had signed their first player in New Zealand international Kris Bright. On 15 November, Stanley Rozario was appointed as the assistant coach. On 23 November, the team was officially unveiled as Bharat FC.

Pre-season
The club started the season with two friendlies against Bombay Engineer Group, which they won 3–0 and the second one 5–0, courtesy two goals from Steven Dias and a goal each from Subhash Singh, Surojit Bose and Jayashelan Prasad. In the last friendly before the season, Bharat FC played against Air India and managed a 2–2 draw with a goal each from Kris Bright and Gunashekar Vignesh.

Matches

I-League

Table

First-team squad

Technical Staff

References

Bharat FC
Bharat FC seasons